Goubuli, also sometimes transcribed as Go Believe, is a brand of stuffed baozi from Tianjin, China. Founded in 1858, it is one of China's longest established brands. Each Goubuli bun has eighteen wrinkles.

Etymology
There are many explanations for the name Goubuli. The oft-quoted one relates to a poor village boy nicknamed Gouzhai. At 14, he became an apprentice at a food store. Thereafter, he set up his own shop specialising in selling steamed, stuffed baozi. His supposedly very delicious baozi soon gained immense popularity in a short period of time. As a result, Gouzhai became too preoccupied with his business to converse with his customers; so they started to complain, "Gouzhai does not talk to people" (which loosely translates as ).

In another similar story, there was a boy named Gao Guiyou who had a terrible attitude and could ignore people for days if he was angered. Thus, he was named by his mother Goubuli (his nickname "Gou" with "Buli" meaning "ignores"). At 14, Gou was sent by his father to Tianjin where he gained apprenticeship at a food shop and, after mastering his skills, set up his own shop named "Goubuli". Goubuli buns soon become popular with the Tianjin locals.

English translation
In 2008, in anticipation of the 2008 Summer Olympics which were to be held in Beijing, Goubuli decided to adopt an English name, "Go Believe", in hope of better name recognition by foreign guests. However, this was met with heavy criticism by Chinese netizens.

, the Goubuli brand is owned by the Chinese pharmaceutical company Tong Ren Tang.

Recognition
Goubuli buns were among the 396 food items awarded the "Famous Chinese Snack" title by the China Cuisine Association in 1997.

Gallery

See also
 List of snack foods
 List of steamed foods

References

External links

Official website

1858 establishments in China
Chinese brands